Saudi nationality law, officially called the Saudi Arabian Citizenship System, is the law that determines who is a Saudi citizen. Foreigners are not given citizenship even if they meet the terms and conditions.

Original Saudis 
Anyone who was born or resided on Saudi Arabian land from 1332 Hijra – 1914 A.D. until 22/3/1345 Hijra provided that they did not acquire a foreign citizenship prior to this date.

By birth 
A child born in Saudi Arabia to a non-Saudi father and a Saudi mother has the right to Saudi citizenship upon reaching the age of majority if they fulfill the following:
 have permanent residency 
 be fluent in Arabic.
 the grandfather of the mother must be Saudi.
 getting an approval from the highest authority in the country (The King).
Children born to unknown parents in Saudi Arabia automatically get citizenship until the identities of the parents are known. Children born to foreigners do not have the right to citizenship, but may be given nationality if they have a Saudi father.

Before the 1970s, anybody who was born in Saudi Arabia had the right for a citizenship. They had to apply for the citizenship at the age of 18, before turning 19.

By descent 
Children born to a Saudi father or an unknown or stateless father and Saudi mother could be a Saudi citizen if the conditions are satisfied.

By marriage 
A foreign woman who marries a Saudi man has right to citizenship provided that she gives up her foreign citizenship. Saudi women who give up citizenship upon marriage to a foreign husband (the marriage should complete 10 years and should have 3 children) has the right to take up Saudi citizenship if she divorces or returns to Saudi Arabia. One can only apply for citizenship if he is mature. Additional conditions are in place before the government will recognize a marriage by a Saudi woman to a non-Saudi man and allow a citizenship application.

Saudis working in various sensitive occupations, as well as members of the royal family, are not allowed to marry foreigners at all.

By naturalization

How to Apply for Citizenship
The applicant or his legal representative can apply to the Civil Affairs department or the Kingdom’s representative abroad. The Interior Ministry Agency of Civil Affairs is responsible for receiving and registering applications to be reviewed. A committee is formed, consisting of three members, whose ranks are not below the eighth rank, one of whom is legally qualified to verify the following:

The applicant must have entered the Kingdom in a legal manner and hold a valid passport that enables him to return to his country without restrictions or conditions.
The applicant must have resided, for a period of no less than ten consecutive years, under a regular residency permit in the Kingdom, with the provisions of its own system.
The applicant must be working in one of the professions that the country needs.
Once the information is provided by the applicant, the committee will evaluate the application based on three components, representing a total of 33 points to be distributed as follows:

Residency of the applicant for at least ten consecutive years with a total score of ten points.
The profession of the applicant is proven through scientific qualifications and is based on the country’s needs. The total points should not exceed 13 points and only one qualification of the applicated is counted as follows:
Doctorate degree in medicine or engineering allotting thirteen points
Doctorate degree in other sciences allotting ten points.
Master’s degree allotting eight points.
Bachelor’s degree allotting five points.
Family ties, ensuring that the applicant has Saudi relatives. The total points should not exceed ten points, distributed as follows:
If the father is Saudi, he is allotted three points.
If the mother and her father are Saudi, three points are allotted, however if only the mother is Saudi and her father is not, two points are allotted.
If the wife and her father are Saudi, three points are allotted, however if the wife is Saudi and her father is not, one point is allotted.
If the applicant has more than two Saudi children and brothers, two points are allotted, however if there are no more than two, one point is allotted.
If the applicant obtains 23 points as a minimum score, the committee recommends that he continues reviewing his application. In the event that he doesn’t not achieve the required limit, it is recommended that the application be kept. The applications are reviewed, and the rest of the procedures are completed and submitted to the Naturalization Committee, in order to issue the final recommendation and present it to the Minister of Interior.

The following actions are taken in relation to applications for citizenships:
Registration of the application in the records of the serial entry at the time of submission. The applicant is given a voucher indicating the number and date of the application.
Fill out the citizenship application form with the applicant’s signature, photo and stamp from the administration.
Fill out three copies of the information form.
Submit an original copy of all documents supported by the applicant.
Inform the applicant of the system’s requirements and ensure that his signature is provided stating his knowledge of the requirements.
A medical report proving mental and physical integrity.
A statement from the authorities concerned with the specialties that the country needs.
A copy of the qualifications, which must be translated to Arabic if it is originally in another language.
Submit a statement about wealth owned inside and outside the Kingdom and his sources of income.
Submit a statement of religious denomination, political or party activity, and previous military services.

Conditions for Obtaining Citizenship
The following is required for an applicant for the Saudi citizenship:

At the time of submitting the application, the applicant must have reached the age of maturity.
The applicant must not be mentally unstable.
Upon submitting the application, the applicant must:

Acquire the status of ordinary permanent residence in the Kingdom of Saudi Arabia, under the provisions of its system for a period of no less than five consecutive years.
The applicant must be of good conduct.
The applicant must not have been sentenced to imprisonment for a moral offense for a period exceeding six months.
The applicant must prove that he earns his income in a legitimate way.

Loss of citizenship 
Loss of Saudi citizenship may occur due to one of the following reasons:
 Works for another country's military.
 Works for another country's government.
Holds a passport of another nation without permission from the King. Dual citizenship is permitted only by birth in a foreign country which allows/enforces citizenship by birth.
Saudi citizens cannot give up their citizenship without permission; however, the government can revoke someone's nationality if the person is a terrorist threat, as in the case of Osama bin Laden.

Dual nationality 
Saudis are not permitted to acquire any foreign citizenship without the permission of the King. If a Saudi Citizen acquired a foreign Citizenship without this permission, they will be considered Saudi unless the Saudi Government revokes their Saudi Citizenship according to the terms of Article 13: takes up foreign Citizenship without permission of the Prime Minister; works for another country's military; works for the benefit of a foreign Government during wartime with the Kingdom of Saudi Arabia; works for a foreign Government or International Organization despite the Saudi Government's order for them to quit.

Travel freedom

In 2018, Saudi citizens had visa-free or visa on arrival access to 74 countries and territories, ranking the Saudi passport 60th in the world according to the Visa Restrictions Index.

References